Giacomo Devecchi (born April 2, 1985), also called Jack Devecchi,  is an Italian professional basketball player for Dinamo Sassari in the Italian Lega Basket Serie A (LBA). He is a  small forward and shooting guard.

Professional career
Giacomo Devecchi made his debut in Lega Basket Serie A with Olimpia Milano in 2001. In 2004 he went to Sutor Montegranaro, but he was later loaned to Dinamo Sassari in 2006 in the second-tier of the Italian league pyramid, Serie A2. With Dinamo Sassari he achieved the promotion to LBA beating 3–1 Veroli Basket in the playoffs.

In July 2010 he signed a contract with Sassari for one season. At the end of the 2011-12 season his team got the 4th place in the League table, and they were eliminated just at the playoffs' semifinals. So in July 2012 the Club decided to renew the contract with Devecchi for three more seasons. In 2016 he became the new team captain.

Honours
Dinamo Sassari
Lega Basket Serie A: 2014–15
Italian Basketball Cup (2): 2014, 2015
Italian Basketball Supercup: 2014
FIBA Europe Cup: 2018–19
Sutor Montegranaro
Serie A2 Basket (2): 2005–06, 2008–09

Personal life
Devecchi is a first cousin of NBA player Danilo Gallinari.

References

External links
Lega Basket Serie A profile  Retrieved 11 January 2017
Serie A2 Basket profile  Retrieved 11 January 2017
Eurobasket profile  Retrieved 11 January 2017

1985 births
Living people
Dinamo Sassari players
Italian men's basketball players
Lega Basket Serie A players
Olimpia Milano players
Shooting guards
Small forwards
Sutor Basket Montegranaro players